was a Japanese novelist born in Fujieda, Shizuoka.

Ogawa was a graduate of the Japanese literature department at Tokyo University. In 1957, Ogawa wrote a book titled Aporon no shima (Isles of Apollo) after taking a trip to the Mediterranean. It was praised by the novelist Toshio Shimao, launching Ogawa's career as a writer. His style is insightful to nature and mankind, and it is noted to be clear yet dense.

He died on April 8, 2008, aged 80, in Shizuoka Prefecture.

References

1927 births
2008 deaths
20th-century Japanese novelists
21st-century Japanese novelists
Writers from Shizuoka Prefecture
People from Fujieda, Shizuoka
University of Tokyo alumni